Sphagnodela is a genus of moths in the family Geometridae erected by Warren in 1893.

References

Geometridae
Geometridae genera